Eri Hozumi and Makoto Ninomiya defeated Tereza Martincová and Markéta Vondroušová in the final, 1–6, 7–6(7–4), [10–7], to win the women's doubles tennis title at the 2022 Adelaide International 2 and their first title together as a duo. Hozumi and Ninomiya saved a match point in the final. 

This was the second edition of the Adelaide International held in 2022.

Seeds

Draw

Draw

References

External links
Main draw

Adelaide International 2 - Doubles
2022
Adel